Kate Alexa is an Australian pop singer-songwriter. She has released one studio album, one soundtrack album and five singles, and is signed to Liberation Music. She has achieved five Australian top thirty singles, and one top one hundred album.

Studio albums

Soundtracks

Singles 

1 Only released in Australia as a radio single.

B-sides

Music videos

Other appearances
The following have been officially released, but do not feature on an album by Alexa.

X Rated  
X Rated has been used quite a few times this year on Home and Away (Last Spin: Ep.5723)

References

Discographies of Australian artists
Pop music discographies